Ogmore by-election may refer to one of four parliamentary by-elections held for the British House of Commons constituency of Ogmore, in South Wales:

 1931 Ogmore by-election
 1946 Ogmore by-election
 2002 Ogmore by-election
 2016 Ogmore by-election

See also
 Ogmore constituency
 List of United Kingdom by-elections
 United Kingdom by-election records